Mad, Bad and Dangerous is the second album released by the late-80s hard rock band Blue Tears. The album was one of many recordings by the band which went unreleased following the increased popularity of alternative and grunge music.

Long after the band members got involved in other projects, some of these unreleased material started to surface on the Internet. Bandleader Gregg Fulkerson decided to compile an album of most of this material and release it officially.

The album was finally released in 2005 by Suncity Records. It marked, perhaps, the return of the band, since they released an all-new album The Innocent Ones the following year.

Track listing
 "Long Way Home"
 "Girl Crazy"
 "With You Tonight"
 "Mystery Man"
 "Rock You to Heaven"
 "Evidence of Love"
 "Mad, Bad & Dangerous to Know"
 "Misty Blue"
 "Kisses in the Dark"
 "Everywhere I Go"
 "Midnight Train"
 "Follow Your Heart"
 "Russia Tonight"
 "Love Machine"
 "The Last Serenade"
 "Live It Up"

Personnel
 Gregg Fulkerson - vocals, guitar
 Charlie Lauderdale - drums
 Bryan Hall - guitar, vocals
 Michael Spears - bass

External links
Album review at Sleaze Roxx
Album review at Melodicrock

2005 albums
Blue Tears albums